The 4th Army was a field army of the Wehrmacht during World War II.

Invasions of Poland and France
The 4th Army was activated on 1 August 1939 with General Günther von Kluge in command. It took part in the Invasion of Poland of September 1939 as part of Army Group North, which was under Field Marshal Feodor von Bock. The 4th Army contained the II Corps and III Corps, each with two infantry divisions, the XIX Corps with two motorized and one panzer divisions, and three other divisions, including two in reserve. Its objective was to capture the Polish Corridor, thus linking mainland Germany with East Prussia.

During the attack on the Low Countries and France, the 4th Army, as part of Field Marshal Gerd von Rundstedt's Army Group A, invaded Belgium from the Rhineland.  Along with other German armies, the 4th Army penetrated the Dyle Line and completed the trapping of the Allied forces in France. The then Major-General Erwin Rommel, who was under Kluge, contributed immensely to his victories.  Kluge, who had been General of the Artillery, was promoted to Field Marshal along with many others on 19 July 1940.

Operation Barbarossa
The 4th Army took part in Operation Barbarossa in 1941 as part of Fedor von Bock's Army Group Center and took part in the Battle of Minsk and the Battle of Smolensk. In the aftermath of the German failure in the Battle of Moscow, Fedor von Bock was relieved of his command of Army Group Center on 18 December. Kluge was promoted to replace him. General Ludwig Kübler assumed command of the 4th Army.

After the launching of Operation Blue, the 4th Army and the entire Army Group Center did not see much action, as troops were concentrated to the south. From 1943 on, the 4th Army was in retreat along with other formations of Army Group Center. The Red Army's campaign of autumn 1943, Operation Suvorov (also known as the "battle of the highways"), saw the 4th Army pushed back towards Orsha. Between October and the first week of December, Western Front had tried four times to take Orsha and had been beaten off in furious battles by Fourth Army.

In 1944, the 4th Army was holding defensive positions east of Orsha and Mogilev in the Belorussian SSR, occupying a bulging, 25- by 80-mile bridgehead east of the Dnepr. The Soviet summer offensive of that year, Operation Bagration, commencing on 22 June, proved disastrous for the Wehrmacht, including the 4th Army. It was encircled east of Minsk and lost 130,000 men in 12 days since the start of Bagration. Few units were able to escape westwards; after the battles in the rest of the summer, the army required complete rebuilding. During late 1944–45 the 4th Army, now under the command of Friedrich Hoßbach, was tasked with holding the borders of East Prussia. On the first week in November in Gumbinnen Operation, the 4th Army pushed back the Soviet forces in the Gumbinnen sector off all but a fifteen-mile by fifty-mile strip of East Prussian territory.

East Prussian Offensive
The Soviet East Prussian Offensive, commencing on 13 January, saw the 2nd Army driven steadily backwards towards the Baltic coast over a period of two weeks and 4th Army threatened with encirclement. Hoßbach, with the Army Group Centre's commander Georg-Hans Reinhardt concurrence, attempted to break out of East Prussia by attacking towards Elbing; but the attack was driven back and the 4th Army was again encircled in what became known as the Heiligenbeil pocket. For defying their orders, both Hoßbach and Reinhardt are relieved of command.

By 13 February, 3rd Belorussian Front had pushed 4th Army out of the Heilsberg triangle. After 13 March 3rd Belorussian Front had pushed 4th Army into a ten by two mile beachhead west of Heiligenbeil before Hitler finally allowed the army to retreat across the Frisches Haff to the Frische Nehrung on 29 March. After Königsberg fell, Hitler sent Headquarters, 4th Army, out of East Prussia and merged its units with 2nd Army to form the East Prussian Army Group, commanded by Dietrich von Saucken, which surrendered to the Red Army at the end of the war in May. Meanwhile, the Headquarters, 4th Army became Headquarters, 21st Army.

Commanders

See also
 4th Army (German Empire) for the WW I German Army formation.

Footnotes

Bibliography

 
 

04
Military units and formations established in 1939
Military units and formations disestablished in 1945